Dandong Langtou Airport is an airport serving the city of Dandong, Liaoning, China .

Airlines and destinations

History

Korean War
Antung Airfield was a major base for People's Liberation Army Air Force (PLAAF) and Korean People's Air Force (KPAF) fighters during the Korean War used in the defense of the supply lines across the Yalu River to the North Korean city of Sinuiju and for engaging attacking USAF aircraft in the area that became known as MiG Alley.

In November 1950 reconnaissance photos showed that the previous two gravel runways had been replaced by a  concrete runway with hard-surfaced taxiways. By March 1951, the PLAAF had at least 75 MiG-15s based at Antung.

Civil operations
On April 29, 1985, Dandong Langtou Airport officially started civil operations. The first route was Shenyang - Dandong - Dalian route operated by An-24 aircraft. The first renovation was carried out on June 18, 1993. After the expansion, it categorized as Category 4C airport by CAAC.

On April 17, 2014, the  new terminal was officially opened. After the expansion, Dandong Airport increased its capacity from the current 50,000 to 2 million passengers per year.

Statistics

Facilities 
There is an international waiting hall and two domestic waiting halls, together with 3 VIP lounges. The new terminal has 4 escalators, 5 elevators and a moving walkway. There are more than 1,000 waiting seats in the 3 waiting halls, as well as drinking water areas and mobile phone charging areas. Each departure hall is equipped with a baby care room, as well as an isolation room and emergency rescue hallway. The new terminal is also equipped with two jet bridges. The  apron can park 6 narrow-body aircraft at the same time.

Gallery

See also
List of airports in the People's Republic of China

References

Airports in Liaoning
Korean War air bases